Operación Triunfo is a Spanish reality television music competition to find new singing talent. The third series, also known as Operación Triunfo 2003, aired on La 1 from 29 September 2003 to 21 December 2003, presented by Carlos Lozano. 

Vicente Seguí was the winner of the series.

Headmaster, judges and presenter
Headmaster: Nina
Judges: Pilar Tabares, Pilar Zamora, Inma Serrano and Narcís Rebollo
Presenter: Carlos Lozano

Contestants

Galas
In this edition, the jury only valued. Who really nominated was the public with their phone calls. The five least voted were in danger zone. One was saved by the jury, another by the Academy's staff, the third by the contestants and the other two were nominated all week, in the hands of the public.

Results summary
Colour key

References

Operación Triunfo
La 1 (Spanish TV channel) original programming